Afterthought may refer to:

Film and TV
 Afterthought (film), a 2015 film

Music
 Afterthoughts (album), a 2013 album by Nosound
 Afterthought, an album by American hip hop producer Fat Jon
 "Afterthought", a song by In Fear and Faith on the 2010 album Imperial
 "Afterthought", a song by Disclosure on the 2015 album Caracal
 "Afterthought", a song by Joji & BENEE on the 2020 album Nectar

See also
 Afterthoughts (retailer), a defunct American retailer
 Epimetheus (mythology), might mean "hindsight", literally "afterthinker"